Aspergillus oryzae, also known as , is a filamentous fungus (a mold) used in East Asia to saccharify rice, sweet potato, and barley in the making of alcoholic beverages such as sake and shōchū, and also to ferment soybeans for making soy sauce and miso. However, in the production of fermented foods of soybeans such as soy sauce and miso, Aspergillus sojae is sometimes used instead of A. oryzae. Incidentally, in China and Korea, the fungi used for fermented foods for a long time in the production of traditional alcoholic beverages were not A. oryzae but fungi belonging to Rhizopus and Mucor.  A. oryzae is also used for the production of rice vinegars. Barley kōji (麦麹) or rice kōji (米麹) are made by fermenting the grains with A. oryzae hyphae.

Genomic analysis has led some scholars to believe that the Japanese domesticated the Aspergillus flavus that had mutated and ceased to produce toxic aflatoxins, giving rise to A. oryzae. 
Eiji Ichishima of Tohoku University called the kōji fungus a "national fungus" (kokkin) in the journal of the Brewing Society of Japan, because of its importance not only for making the kōji for sake brewing, but also for making the kōji for miso, soy sauce, and a range of other traditional Japanese foods. His proposal was approved at the society's annual meeting in 2006.

The Japanese word kōji (麹) is used in several meanings, and in some cases it specifically refers to A. oryzae and A. sojae, while in other cases it refers to all molds used in fermented foods, including Monascus purpureus and other molds, so care should be taken to avoid confusion.

Properties desirable in sake brewing and testing

The following properties of A. oryzae strains are important in rice saccharification for sake brewing:
Growth: rapid mycelial growth on and into the rice kernels
Enzymes: strong secretion of amylases (α-amylase and glucoamylase); some carboxypeptidase; low tyrosinase
Aesthetics: pleasant fragrance; accumulation of flavoring compounds
Color: low production of deferriferrichrome (a siderophore), flavins, and other colored substances

Varieties used for shōchū making
Three varieties of kōji mold are used for making shōchū, each with distinct characteristics.

Genichirō Kawachi (1883 -1948), who is said to be the father of modern shōchū and Tamaki Inui (1873 -1946), a lecturer at University of Tokyo succeeded in the first isolation and culturing of aspergillus species such as A. kawachii, A. awamori, and a variety of subtaxa of A. oryzae, which let to great progress in producing shōchū in Japan. Since then, aspergillus developed by Kawachi has also been used for soju and makgeolli in Korea.

 Yellow kōji (A. oryzae etc.) is used to produce sake, and at one time all honkaku shōchū. However, yellow kōji is extremely sensitive to temperature; its moromi can easily sour during fermentation. This makes it difficult to use in warmer regions such as Kyūshū, and gradually black and white kōji became more common in production of shōchū.  Its strength is that it gives rise to a rich, fruity, refreshing taste, so despite the difficulties and great skill required, it is still used by some manufacturers. It is popular amongst young people who previously had no interest in typically strong potato shōchū, playing a role in its recent revival. Thus, white and black kōji are mainly used in the production of shōchū, but only yellow kōji (A. oryzae) is usually used in the production of sake.
 White kōji (A. kawachii etc.) was discovered as a mutation from black kōji by Genichirō Kawachi in 1923. This effect was researched and white kōji was successfully grown independently. White kōji is easy to cultivate and its enzymes promote rapid saccharization; as a result, it is used to produce most shōchū today. It gives rise to a drink with a refreshing, mild, sweet taste.
 Black kōji (A. awamori also known as A. luchuensis etc.)  is mainly used to produce shōchū and awamori. In 1901, Tamaki Inui, lecturer at University of Tokyo succeeded in the first isolating and culturing. In 1910, Genichirō Kawachi succeeded for the first time in culturing var. kawachi, a variety of subtaxa of A. awamori. This improved the efficiency of shōchū production. It produces plenty of citric acid which helps to prevent the souring of the moromi. Of all three kōji, it most effectively extracts the taste and character of the base ingredients, giving its shōchū a rich aroma with a slightly sweet, mellow taste. Its spores disperse easily, covering production facilities and workers' clothes in a layer of black. Such issues led to it falling out of favour, but due to the development of new kuro-kōji (NK-kōji) in the mid-1980s, interest in black kōji resurged amongst honkaku shōchū makers because of the depth and quality of the taste it produced.  Several popular brands now explicitly state they use black kōji on their labels.

Genome
Initially kept secret, the A. oryzae genome was released by a consortium of Japanese biotechnology companies in late 2005. The eight chromosomes together comprise 37 million base pairs and 12 thousand predicted genes. The genome of A. oryzae is thus one-third larger than that of two related Aspergillus species, the genetics model organism A. nidulans and the potentially dangerous A. fumigatus.  Many of the extra genes present in A. oryzae are predicted to be involved in secondary metabolism. The sequenced strain isolated in 1950 is called RIB40 or ATCC 42149; its morphology, growth, and enzyme production are typical of strains used for sake brewing.

Use in biotechnology 
Trans-resveratrol can be efficiently cleaved from its glucoside piceid through the process of fermentation by A. oryzae.

Secondary metabolites
A. oryzae is a good choice as a secondary metabolite factory because of its relatively few endogenous secondary metabolites. Transformed types can produce: polyketide synthase-derived 1,3,6,8-tetrahydroxynaphthalene, alternapyrone, and 3-methylorcinaldehyde; citrinin; terrequinone A; tennelin, pyripyropene, aphidicolin, terretonin, and andrastin A by plasmid insertion; paxilline and aflatrem by co-transformation; and aspyridone, originally from A. nidulans, by Gateway cloning.

History
麹 (Chinese qū, Japanese kōji)  which means mold used in fermented foods, was first mentioned in the Zhouli (Rites of the Zhou dynasty) in China in 300 BCE. Its development is a milestone in Chinese food technology, for it provides the conceptual framework for three major fermented soy foods: soy sauce, jiang/miso, and douchi, not to mention grain-based wines (including Japanese sake and Chinese huangjiu) and li (the Chinese forerunner of Japanese amazake).

Gallery

See also

References

External links 
Making Rice Koji from Koji Spores
Sake World's description of koji
Aspergillus oryzae genome from the Database of Genomes Analysed at NITE 
Global Aspergillus oryzae Market Report 2020 - Market Size, Share, Price, Trend and Forecast
(DOGAN)

oryzae
Rice wine
Molds used in food production
Fungi of Japan
Japanese cuisine